Senator Dart may refer to:

Tom Dart (born 1962), Illinois State Senate
William A. Dart (1814–1890), New York State Senate
Justus Dartt (1836–1912), Vermont State Senate